Herderia is a genus of flowering plants in the sunflower family.

Species
There is only one accepted species, Herderia truncata, native to West Africa from Sierra Leone to Chad and Mali.

References

External links
West African Plants, photo by Marco Schmidt, taken in Burkina Faso

Monotypic Asteraceae genera
Vernonieae
Flora of West Tropical Africa